The 1984–85 Toto Cup Leumit was the 1st season of the third most important football tournament in Israel since its introduction. 

It was held in two stages. First, the 16 Liga Leumit teams were divided into four groups. The group winners advanced to the semi-finals, which, as was the final, were held as one-legged matches. 

The competition was won by Maccabi Yavne, who had beaten Beitar Jerusalem 2–1 in the final.

Group stage
The matches were played from 30 October 1984 to 6 April 1985.

Group A

Group B

Group C

Group D

Elimination rounds

Semifinals

Replay

Final

See also
 1984–85 Toto Cup Artzit

References

Leumit
Toto Cup Leumit
Toto Cup Leumit